Reza Atri Nagharchi (born 8 August 1994 in Babol) is an Iranian freestyle wrestler. He won the silver medal in the 61kg event at the 2022 World Wrestling Championships held in Belgrade, Serbia. He won a gold medal at the 2019 Asian Championship, and bronze medals at the 2017 Asian Championships and 2018 Asian Games.

Career 
Atri began his professional career with a silver medal at the Junior Asian Championship, 2014 in the 55 kg division. Moving up to the senior level, Atri achieved a bronze medal at the 2015 Military World Games. In the following year, Atri earned two gold medals in the Aleksandr Medved's Prizes, and the Paris Tournament.  At the 2017 Asian Wrestling Championships, Atri was awarded a bronze medal after defeating his opponent from South Korea. At the 2018 Asian games, Atri wrestled in the 57 kg division and won a bronze medal after defeating Bhagawati Sah Teli , Sandeep Tomar, and Kim Sung-gwon. A year after,  Atri claimed a gold medal at the 2019 Asian wrestling championships after winning Kang Kum-song in the final match. In the same year, Atri secured the fifth place in the world championships and qualified for the 2020 Summer Olympics. At the 2020 Summer Olympics, Atri valiantly won against Süleyman Atlı and Erdenebatyn Bekhbayar and proceeded to the semifinal, but then he lost to Zaur Uguev and couldn't make it to the final match and ended up with the fifth place.

On 18 September 2022, he competed at the 2022 World Wrestling Championships in the 61 kg division achieved the silver medal. After winning four matches and defeating  Besir Alili, Islam Bazarganov , Georgi Vangelov, and Narmandakhyn Narankhüü , Atri lost the final match to the Japanese wrestler Rei Higuchi.

Achievements 
 World Championships –  2022
 World Cup –  2016
 Asian Championships –  2017,  2019
 Asian Games –  2018
 Paris Tournament –  2016
 Aleksandr Medved's Prizes –  2016
 Military World Games –  2015
 Asian Junior Championship –  2014

References

External links

 
 
 
 Reza Atri on Instagram
 Reza Atri on Facebook

Living people
1994 births
Iranian male sport wrestlers
Wrestlers at the 2018 Asian Games
Medalists at the 2018 Asian Games
Asian Games medalists in wrestling
Asian Games bronze medalists for Iran
Wrestlers at the 2020 Summer Olympics
Olympic wrestlers of Iran
World Wrestling Championships medalists
People from Babol
Sportspeople from Mazandaran province
20th-century Iranian people
21st-century Iranian people